Merophyas leucaniana is a species of moth of the  family Tortricidae. It is found in New Zealand.

The forewings are whitish straw, with slightly darker lines along the veins. There are two brown discal stripes. The hindwings are whitish cinereous.

References

	

Moths described in 1863
Archipini
Endemic fauna of New Zealand
Taxa named by Francis Walker (entomologist)
Endemic moths of New Zealand